Manniche is a surname. Notable people with the surname include:

Claus Manniche (born 1956), Danish rheumatologist
Michael Manniche (born 1959), Danish footballer

Danish-language surnames